Ted Washburn (born April 9, 1941) is an American Republican politician. He is a member of the Montana Legislature, who serves to the House District 69.

References

1941 births
Living people
People from White Plains, New York
Republican Party members of the Montana House of Representatives